For the 1960 Summer Olympics, a total of thirty-four sports venues were used. The Basilica of Maxentius, the Baths of Caracalla, the Appian Way, and Via Cassia were among the ancient Roman venues used for the games. The football stadium in Florence hosted the 1934 FIFA World Cup and would later host the 1990 FIFA World Cup. Stadio Olimpico would later serve host to the 1987 IAAF World Championships in Athletics and the final venue for the 1990 FIFA World Cup. The marathon would be lit at night by Italian soldiers holding torches that included the Appian Way with a finish at the Arch of Constantine.

Venues

Before the Olympics
Rome was scheduled to host the 1908 Summer Olympics, but had to withdraw due to the eruption of Mount Vesuvius in 1906. The 1908 Games were given to London as a result following a meeting at the 1906 Intercalated Games in Athens.

Rome hosted the ISSF World Shooting Championships (then UIT) five times from 1897 to the start of World War II, doing so in 1902, 1911, 1927, 1930, and 1935.

The biggest event for Italy was hosting the 1934 FIFA World Cup in which the host nation won. Florence's stadium hosted three matches during the World Cup while the finals would be played in Rome, at a stadium located on the current site of the Flaminio Stadium. Stadio Flaminio would be constructed in 1957 following the demolition of Stadio Nazionale PNF in 1953.

The Palazzo dei Congressi was constructed in 1942 for a Universal Exposition in that year that was not held to World War II. Palazzetto Dello Sport was constructed in time for the 1960 Games in 1957.

During the Olympics
Pope John XXIII watched some of the canoeing semifinals at the window of his summer residence overlooking Lake Albano. The marathon event was run along Via Appia Antica and finished at the Arch of Constantine. With the event being run at night, the course was illuminated by Italian soldiers holding torches.

During the road team time trial event at Via Cristoforo Colombo in  heat, Danish cyclist Knud Enemark Jensen collapsed from sunstroke, suffered a fractured skull, and later died from it. Autopsy results determined that Jensen had taken Roniacol, a blood circulation stimulant. Before Jensen's collapse, Denmark had been in fourth place at the  mark of the event.

After the Olympics
Stadio Olimpico del Norto hosted the FINA World Aquatics Championships in 1994.

Palazzo dei Congressi continues as an exhibition center in Rome.

In 1987, Stadio Olimpico hosted the second World Athletics Championships. During the following three years, the stadium was reconstructed to serve as one of the twelve venues used for the FIFA World Cup. The stadium itself hosted the finals for that tournament. The Stadium at Florence which hosted some of the 1934 World Cup matches, hosted four 1990 World Cup matches, including the quarterfinal match between Argentina and Yugoslavia.

References

 
1960 Summer Olympic venues
1960
it:Giochi della XVII Olimpiade#Strutture